The Food Packaging Forum is a nonprofit foundation established in 2012 and based in Zurich, Switzerland. It is a science communication organization that provides information on chemicals in all food packaging materials and their impacts on health.  In doing so, the Food Packaging Forum aims to address a wide range of stakeholders, including business decision-makers, regulators, media and communication experts, scientists, and consumers. Topics within the organization's scope of work include issues such as chemical migration, endocrine disruptors, low dose effects, and mixture toxicity. It produces educational documents about these topics in plain language.

Operation
The Food Packaging Forum is operated by a foundation board with advice from a scientific advisory board consisting of independent scientists. It is funded by unconditional donations, mainly from glass packaging industry, as well as funding from the MAVA Foundation, the European Environment and Health Initiative, and the Plastics Solution Fund.

Events and Collaborations
The Food Packaging Forum organizes meetings, webinars, and presentations about food packaging issues and runs an annual workshop aimed to support dialogue surrounding improving food safety.

The Food Packaging Forum conducts studies about the chemicals in food packaging  and is a stakeholder in a range of research projects including the EU-funded project LIFE-EDESIA, which investigates chemical alternatives to bisphenols, phthalates and parabens. The Food Packaging Forum also contributed to the report "A Circular Economy for Plastics", published by the European Commission.

See also
Environmental Health

References

External links
 

Foundations based in Switzerland